Raptocleidus is an extinct genus of plesiosaurid from Lower Jurassic (Pliensbachian stage) deposits of Lyme Regis, southern United Kingdom. It is known from a partial skeleton missing the skull.

See also

 List of plesiosaur genera
 Timeline of plesiosaur research

References

Early Jurassic plesiosaurs of Europe
Fossil taxa described in 2011
Plesiosauroids